Robert of France may refer to:
 Robert I of France (866–923), King of Western Francia
 Robert II of France (972–1031), King of France